Osmia glauca is a species in the genus Osmia ("mason bees"), in the family Megachilidae ("leafcutter, mason, and resin bees, and allies").
It is found in North America.

References

Further reading
 Arnett, Ross H. (2000). American Insects: A Handbook of the Insects of America North of Mexico. CRC Press.
 Krombein, Karl V., Paul D. Hurd Jr., David R. Smith, and B. D. Burks (1979). Catalog of Hymenoptera in America North of Mexico, vol. 2: Apocrita (Aculeata), xvi + 1199–2209.

External links
NCBI Taxonomy Browser, Osmia glauca

glauca
Insects described in 1899